Alexander Charles Albert House (born December 11, 1986) is a Canadian actor best known for his Gemini Award winning role in the television series Todd and the Book of Pure Evil.

Early life
House was born and raised in Toronto, Ontario, Canada.

Career
House started his career as a child actor, beginning when a friend's mother introduced him to an agent. Among many others credits he played a recurring guest star role as Tim on the fifth season of the Canadian TV series Degrassi: The Next Generation and Lance Stone (as well as his alter ego, Blaze) on Dark Oracle. House guest-starred on many Canadian series such as Corner Gas and Life with Derek.

House's most notable role is Todd Smith in the Canadian television series Todd and the Book of Pure Evil for Space Channel. House and his co-stars were awarded a Gemini Award for Best Ensemble Performance in a Comedy Program or Series in August 2011.

Filmography

Film

Television

References

External links
 
 

Male actors from Toronto

Canadian male film actors
Canadian male television actors
Canadian male child actors
Canadian male voice actors
Living people
1986 births
20th-century Canadian male actors
21st-century Canadian male actors